is a Japanese women's fashion and lifestyle magazine published by Shueisha. The magazine is headquartered in Tokyo.

Men's Non-no, targeted for a male demographic, was first published in 1987.

History
The magazine was established as a fortnightly in 1971. The first issue appeared in February 1971. Like CanCam, non-no has a comparatively longer history than other Japanese fashion magazines e.g. Cawaii!, Olive, and so forth. The magazine targets teens and young women in their early 20s.

Instead of focusing on gossip, Non-no and another women's magazine, An An provide their readers with materials with the aim of developing their self-identity.

On 25 May 1987 Shueisha launched the magazine's male counterpart, Men's Non-no.

In 1978 the circulation of Non-no was 850,000 copies. In year 2006, the magazine sold 440,870 copies.

Exclusive models

Current 

 Yūka Suzuki (2014–present)
 Fumika Baba (2015–present)
 Nanaka Matsukawa (2017–present)
 Risa Watanabe (2017–present)
 Manami Enosawa (2018–present)
 Asuka Kijima (2018–present)
 Mirei Sasaki (2019-present)
 Sakura Endo (2020-present) 
 Mayu Yokota (2020-present)
 Ayaka Konno (2021-present) 
 Kanon (2022-present)

Former 

Airi Tanaka
Akiko Kikuchi
Anne Watanabe
Ayumi
Azusa Takehana
Emi
Etsuko Sugai
Hana
Hana Matsushima
Izumi Yamaguchi
Keiko Kurihara
Lina Ohta
Manami Teruya
Michi Ōmori
Miki
Momoko Nagano
Nishida Naomi
Noriko Amakasu
Satsuki Katayama
Shiho
Yasue Sato
Yuko Gomiyo
Sachie Futamura
Mina Sayado
 Yasuko Matsuyuki (1990s)
 Yui Natsukawa (1990s)
 Ryō (1990s)
 Sachiko Katō (1990s)
 Koyuki (1990s)
 Kimiko Mori (1999–2001)
 Miho Tanaka (2000–2012)
 Ema Fujisawa (2001–2005)
 Sachiko Ogata (2002–2005)
 Rena Takeshita (2004–2009)
 Miyu Kogawa (2004–2010)
 Momoko Kuroki (2005–2007)
 Mew Azama (2006–2007)
 Miyu (2006–2010)
 Saori Watanabe (2007–2010)
 Emi Takahashi (2007–2011)
 Mikiko Yano (2008–2012)
 Cecil Kishimoto (2008–2015)
 Yumi Yamamoto 2009–2010)
 Moeka Nozaki 2009–2012)
 Nanao (2010–2011)
 Naoko Akatani (2010–2012)
 Shiori Sato (2010–2012)
 Nanaka (2010–2012)
 Nozomi Sasaki (2010–2013)
 Arisa Sato (2010–2014)
 Tsubasa Honda (2010–2018)
 Arisa Nishida (2011–2013)
 Noa Iwamoto (2011–2013)
 Nagisa Ōshima (2011–2013)
 Erena Mizusawa (2011–2013)
 Kyoko Hinami (2011–2013)
 Aya Ōmasa (2011–2016)
 Mao Ueda (2011–2016)
 Mio Uema (2012–2013)
 Saori Seto (2012–2014)
 Moe Arai (2012–2014)
 Azusa Mine (2012–2014)
 Mirei Kiritani (2012–2015)
 Haru (2012–2015)
 Sayaka Okada (2012–2018)
 Azusa Okamoto (2012–2018)
 Honoka Miki (2013–2014)
 Sachie Futamura (2013–2015)
 Seika Taketomi (2013–2016)
 Hinako Kinoshita (2013–2017)
 Miki Sato (2014–2016)
 Kang Ji-young (2014–2016)
 Akiko Kuji (2014–2017)
 Nina Endō (2014–2018)
 Mina Sayado (2015–2018)
 Anri Okamoto (2015–2018)
 Yuuna Suzuki (2014–2019)
 Haru Izumi (2013–2019)
 Riho Takada (2014–2019)
 Eri Satō (2016–2019)
 Raimu Taya (2018–2020)
 Mana Kinjō (2016–2020)
 Rena Takeda (2016–2021)
 Yua Shinkawa (2015–2021)
 Yuko Araki (2014–2021)
 Nanase Nishino (2015-2022)

References

External links 
non-no - Official website 

1971 establishments in Japan
Biweekly magazines published in Japan
Fashion magazines published in Japan
Magazines established in 1971
Magazines published in Tokyo
Monthly magazines published in Japan
Shueisha magazines
Women's magazines published in Japan
Women's fashion magazines